Behind the Scenes is a 1908 American silent short drama film written and directed by D. W. Griffith.

Cast
 Florence Lawrence as Mrs. Bailey
 Gladys Egan as Mrs. Bailey's Daughter
 Kate Bruce
 George Gebhardt as Member of Audience
 Robert Harron as Messenger
 Charles Inslee as Manager
 George Nichols as The Doctor
 Mack Sennett as Backstage Man

References

External links
 

1908 films
1908 drama films
1908 short films
Silent American drama films
American silent short films
American black-and-white films
Films directed by D. W. Griffith
1900s American films
American drama short films